John George MacKay (November 6, 1893 – October 21, 1974) was a farmer and political figure on Prince Edward Island. He represented 4th Prince in the Legislative Assembly of Prince Edward Island from 1949 to 1966 as a Liberal. MacKay was the 20th Lieutenant Governor of Prince Edward Island, serving from October 6, 1969 to October 24, 1974.

Biography 
He was born in Albany, Prince Edward Island, the son of David MacKay and Almira Harvey, and was educated there. MacKay married Muriel Beatrice Boulter in 1918. He was president of the Tryon Dairying Company and the Tryon Farmers' Institute and also served as a director of the Provincial Swine Breeders' Association. MacKay served in the 10th Siege Battery with the Canadian Expeditionary Force during World War I. After the war, he continued his military service in the Canadian Militia as a sergeant in The Prince Edward Island Light Horse (now part of The Prince Edward Island Regiment (RCAC)). He was a member of the provincial cabinet as a minister without portfolio in 1952 and as Minister of Highways from 1955 to 1959. MacKay died in office at the Prince Edward Island Hospital in Charlottetown at the age of 80.

References 

Lieutenant Governors of Prince Edward Island
Prince Edward Island Liberal Party MLAs
1893 births
1974 deaths
Prince Edward Island Regiment